The Secretary for Transport and Logistics in Hong Kong is responsible for transport and logistics related issues. The position was created in 2022 to replace the previous position of Secretary for the Transport and Housing. The position of Secretary for Transport can be traced back to 1981.

List of office holders
Political party:

Secretaries for Transport, 1981–1997

Secretaries for Transport, 1997–2002 

 Transport affairs were handled by Secretary for Environment, Transport and Works between 2002 and 2007.

Secretaries for Transport and Housing, 2007–2022

Secretaries for Transport and Logistics, 2022–present

References

External links
Organisation chart of Hong Kong Government

Transport
Hong Kong